Yacov Hadas-Handelsman (born August 22, 1957 in Tel Aviv) is the Israeli Ambassador to Hungary. From 2012 to 2017 he was the Israeli ambassador to Germany, based at the Embassy of Israel, Berlin.

He earned a BA in Middle East and political science studies from Tel Aviv University and an MA in Middle East studies from Hebrew University.

References 

1957 births
Living people
Ambassadors of Israel to Germany
Ambassadors of Israel to Hungary
Ambassadors of Israel to Jordan
Ambassadors of Israel to the European Union
Hebrew University of Jerusalem alumni
People from Tel Aviv
Tel Aviv University alumni